Philotheus of Sinai was a Christian monk and writer who lived in Egypt. He lived sometime before 1100 – most likely during the 9th century, or possibly the 10th century. Very little is known about his life.

Life
Philotheus was the hegumen of Saint Catherine's Monastery (also known as the Monastery of the Burning Bush) in the Sinai Peninsula.

Philotheus of Sinai followed the Sinaitic ascetic tradition of John Climacus. His writings are similar to those of Hesychius of Sinai. These three monks of Sinai (namely John Climacus, Hesychius of Sinai, and Philotheus of Sinai) are often considered to form a single Sinaitic literary and religious tradition.

Works
His 40 Texts on Watchfulness are included in the Philokalia.

See also
Nepsis (watchfulness)

References

9th-century births
9th-century deaths
Philokalia
9th-century Byzantine writers
Eastern Orthodox priests
Hegumens
Egyptian Christian monks